St Mary's Church is a parish church in the Church of England in Clifton, Nottinghamshire.

The church is Grade I listed by the Department for Digital, Culture, Media and Sport as a building of outstanding architectural or historic interest.

History

The church is mediaeval. It was restored by Lewis Nockalls Cottingham in 1846, C. Hodgson Fowler in 1874, George Frederick Bodley in 1884, George Pace and Ronald Sims between 1969 and 1979.

Features

The reredos formerly at the Society of the Sacred Mission at Kelham College and much of the decoration is by George Frederick Bodley.

Organ

The organ is by Marcussen & Søn of Denmark and was installed in 1973. The organist at this time was Ian Abernethy.

Parsonage

The parsonage house was enlarged in 1830 by Henry Moses Wood.

Sources

The Buildings of England, Nottinghamshire. Nikolaus Pevsner

See also

List of works by George Pace

References

Grade I listed churches in Nottinghamshire
Church of England church buildings in Nottinghamshire
Clifton St. Mary
Mary